Grevillea lavandulacea, commonly known as lavender grevillea, is a species of flowering plant in the family Proteaceae and is endemic to southern continental Australia. It is a prostrate to spreading shrub with linear to elliptic leaves and clusters of pink to red flowers.

Description

Taxonomy
Grevillea lavandulacea was first formally described by in 1847 by botanist Diederich Franz Leonhard von Schlechtendal in the journal Linnaea. The specific epithet (lavendulacea) means lavender.

In 2000, Robert Owen Makinson described two subspecies of G. lavendulacea in the Flora of Australia and the names are accepted by the Australian Plant Census:
 Grevillea lavandulacea Schltdl. subsp. lavandulacea;

Distribution and habitat
Subspecies lavendulacea grows in a range of habitats from heathland to open woodland and dense shrubland and is found in the south-east of South Australia, including the Flinders Range, and west of the Grampians in western Victoria. Subspecies rogersii grows in shrubland, forest and woodland and is restricted to Kangaroo Island in South Australia.

Use in horticulture
Grevillea lavandulacea is cultivated as an ornamental plant, for use in well draining and drought tolerant gardens. A number of naturally occurring forms have been introduced into cultivation from localities including Adelaide Hills, Black Range, Flinders Ranges, Little Desert, Mount Compass, Penola, Victor Harbor and Woakwine. The commonly grown cultivar G. lavendulacea 'Tanunda' is thought to have originated from Aldinga in South Australia, rather than Tanunda in the Barossa Valley where a different form occurs.

References

lavandulacea
Flora of South Australia
Flora of Victoria (Australia)
Proteales of Australia
Garden plants of Australia